Rade Milovanović (born 12 November 1954), is a Bosnian chess International Master (IM) (1988) who has represented the United States since 2002, and was a Chess Olympiad team silver medalist in 1994.

Biography
In 1972, in Tuzla Rade Milovanović won the Bosnia and Herzegovina Junior Chess Championship. In 1973, he won silver medal in the Yugoslavian Junior Chess Championship and won gold medal in the Balkan Junior Chess Championship. 

Rade Milovanović played for Yugoslavia in the Men's Chess Balkaniad:
 In 1973, at first reserve board in the 5th Men's Chess Balkaniad in Poiana Brașov (+2, =2, -0) he won a team bronze medal and individual gold medal.

Rade Milovanović graduated University of Belgrade Faculty of Law in the mid-1970s. In 1988, he won International Chess Tournaments in Warsaw and Italy. In 1988, he was awarded the FIDE International Master (IM) title. In 1989, he came second in the International Chess Tournament in Tuzla. After the breakup of Yugoslavia, he represented Bosnia and Herzegovina.

Rade Milovanović played for Bosnia and Herzegovina in the Chess Olympiad:
 In 1994, at second reserve board in the 31st Chess Olympiad in Moscow (+1, =0, -1) and won a team silver medal.

Rade Milovanović moved to the United States in August 1998 and settled in Dallas. He won or split first place in several United States chess tournaments: PanAm Open (1998), Texoma Open (1999), Texas Masters (2002), U.S. Open Chess Championship (2008). In 1998, he won a chess tournament in Houston and in 1999 he won the Texas State Chess Championship. In 2000, Rade Milovanović shared 1st place in the international Chess Tournament in Las Vegas - National Open and in  Dallas won the chess blitz tournament WBCA Grand Prix Blitz.

He has been working as a chess coach since 2001 in University of Texas at Dallas.

References

External links

Rade Milovanović chess games at 365chess.com

1954 births
Living people
American chess players
Bosnia and Herzegovina chess players
Yugoslav chess players
Chess International Masters
Chess Olympiad competitors
University of Belgrade Faculty of Law alumni